Honour is a 1995 play by the Australian playwright Joanna Murray-Smith.

It tells the tale of a middle aged man, George, who leaves his wife, Honor, and their 24-year-old daughter, Sophie, for a relationship with a much younger woman by the name of Claudia.

It was first performed in Melbourne on 14 November 1995 and has since been performed in more than three dozen countries, including on Broadway and in the West End.

Characters
 Honor, a beautiful, elegant woman aged around sixty
 George, an attractive, youthful man, aged around sixty
 Sophie, their 24-year-old daughter
 Claudia, a striking woman, aged around thirty

Notable Productions

References

Australian plays
1995 plays